Mesorhizobium tianshanense, formerly known as Rhizobium tianshanense, is a Gram negative species of bacteria found in the root nodules of many plant species. Its type strain is A-1BS (= CCBAU3306).

References

Further reading

External links

LPSN
Type strain of Mesorhizobium tianshanense at BacDive -  the Bacterial Diversity Metadatabase

Phyllobacteriaceae
Bacteria described in 1995